The Lena (Eljune; , Ölüöne; , Zülkhe; , Zülge) is the easternmost of the three great Siberian rivers that flow into the Arctic Ocean (the other two being the Ob and the Yenisey). Permafrost underlies most of the catchment, 77% of which is continuous. The Lena is the eleventh-longest river in the world, and the longest river entirely within Russia.

Course

From Yakutsk it enters the Central Yakutian Lowland and flows north until joined by its right-hand tributary the Aldan and its most important left-hand tributary, the Vilyuy. After that, it bends westward and northward, flowing between the Kharaulakh Range, part of the Verkhoyansk Range, in the east and the Chekanovsky Ridge in the west. Making its way nearly due north it expands into a large delta and ends in the Laptev Sea, a division of the Arctic Ocean, south-west of the New Siberian Islands.

Basin
Gold is washed out of the sands of the Vitim and the Olyokma, and mammoth tusks have been dug out of the delta. There are numerous lakes in the floodplain of the river. Lakes Nedzheli and Ulakhan-Kyuel are the largest in the basin of the Lena.

Tributaries
The Kirenga flows north between the upper Lena River and Lake Baikal. The Vitim drains the area northeast of Lake Baikal. The Olyokma flows north. The Amga makes a long curve southeast and parallel to the Lena and flows into the Aldan. The Aldan also curves roughly parallel to the Lena until it turns east and flows into the Lena north of Yakutsk. The Maya, a tributary of the Aldan, drains an area almost to the Sea of Okhotsk. The T-shaped Chona-Vilyuy system drains most of the area to the west.

The main tributaries of the Lena are, from source to mouth:

 Tutura (right)
 Ilga (left)
 Kuta (left)
 Tayura (right)
 Kirenga (right)
 Pilyuda (left)
 Chechuy (right)
 Ichera (left)
 Chaya (right)
 Chuya (right)
 Vitim (right)
 Peleduy (left)
 Nyuya (left)
 Derba (left)
 Ura (left)
 Bolshoy Patom (right)
 Cherendey (left)
 Biryuk (left)
 Olyokma (right)
Chara
 Markha (left)
 Tuolba (right)
 Sinyaya (left)
 Buotama (right)
 Menda (right)
 Myla (right)
 Tamma (right)
 Lyutenge (right)
 Suola (right)
 Aldan (right)
 Batamay (right)
 Belyanka (right)
 Munni
 Lyapiske (right)
 Tympylykan (left)
 Dyanyshka (right)
 Tyugyuene (left)
 Sitte (left)
 Khanchaly (left)
 Kenkeme (left)
 Lungkha (left)
 Namana (left)
 Vilyuy (left)
 Chona
 Linde (left)
 Undyulyung (right)
 Nuora (left)
 Begidyan (right)
 Khoruongka (left)
 Sobolokh-Mayan (right)
 Muna (left)
 Menkere (right)
 Motorchuna (left)
 Molodo (left)
Syungyude
 Natara (right)
 Uel-Siktyakh (right)
 Kuranakh-Siktyakh (right)
 Eyekit (left)
 Bulkur (left)

History

It is commonly believed that the Lena derives its name from the original Even-Evenk name Elyu-Ene, which means "the Large River".

According to folktales related a century later, in the years 1620–1623 a party of Russian fur hunters under the leadership of Demid Pyanda sailed up Nizhnyaya Tunguska, discovered the Lena, and either carried their boats there or built new ones. In 1628 Vasily Bugor and 10 men reached the Lena, collected 'yasak' (tribute) from the 'natives' and then founded Kirinsk in 1632. In 1631 the voyevoda of Yeniseysk sent Pyotr Beketov and 20 men to construct a fortress at Yakutsk (founded in 1632). From Yakutsk other expeditions spread out to the south and east. The Lena delta was reached in 1633.

Two of the three groups of survivors of ill-fated Jeannette expedition reached Lena Delta in September 1881. The one led by engineer George W. Melville was rescued by native Tungus huntsmen. Of the group led by Captain George W. De Long only two of the men survived, the others died of starvation.

Baron Eduard Von Toll, accompanied by Alexander von Bunge, led an expedition that explored the Lena delta and the islands of New Siberia on behalf of the Russian Imperial Academy of Sciences in 1885. In 1886 they investigated the New Siberian Islands and the Yana River and its tributaries.

The Lena massacre was the name given to the 1912 shooting-down of striking goldminers and local citizens who protested at the working conditions in the mine near Bodaybo in northern Irkutsk. The incident was reported in the Duma (parliament) by Kerensky and is credited with stimulating revolutionary feeling in Russia.

Vladimir Ilyich Ulyanov may have taken his alias, Lenin, from the river Lena, when he was exiled to the Central Siberian Plateau.

Delta

The delta is frozen tundra for about seven months of the year, but in May the region is transformed into a lush wetland for a few months. Part of the area is protected as the Lena Delta Wildlife Reserve.

The Lena delta divides into a multitude of flat islands. The most important are (from west to east): Chychas Aryta, Petrushka, Sagastyr, Samakh Ary Diyete, Turkan Bel'keydere, Sasyllakh Ary, Kolkhoztakh Bel'keydere, Grigoriy Diyelyakh Bel'kee (Grigoriy Islands), Nerpa Uolun Aryta, Misha Bel'keydere, Atakhtay Bel'kedere, Arangastakh, Urdiuk Pastakh Bel'key, Agys Past' Aryta, Dallalakh Island, Otto Ary, Ullakhan Ary and Orto Ues Aryta.

Turukannakh-Kumaga is a long and narrow island off the Lena delta's western shore.

One of the Lena delta islands, Ostrov Amerika-Kuba-Aryta or Ostrov Kuba-Aryta, was named after the island of Cuba during Soviet times. It is on the northern edge of the delta.

Further reading
Alexander von Bunge & Eduard von Toll (1887), The Expedition to the New Siberian Islands and the Yana country, equipped by the Imperial Academy of Sciences.
Jeffrey Tayler (2006), River of No Reprieve: Descending Siberia's Waterway of Exile, Death, and Destiny

See also
 Lena Cheeks
 Lena Pillars
 Lena Plateau
 List of rivers of Russia
 List of longest undammed rivers
 Tukulan
 William Barr, writer of The First Soviet Convoy to the Mouth of the Lena.

References

External links

 Arctic Great Rivers Observatory (ArcticGRO)
 NASA Earth Observatory page on flooding on the Lena River
 Information and a map of the Lena's watershed
 Permafrost in the Lena Delta
 Alfred Wegner institute (AWI) Publications, Berichte zur Polar- und Meeresforschung (Reports on polar and marine research) - free, downloadable research reports on the biology, geology, oceanography, hydrology, paleontology, paleoclimatology, fauna, flora, soils, cryology, and so forth of the Lena Delta, Laptev Sea, and other parts of the Arctic Circle.

 
 
Rivers of Irkutsk Oblast
Rivers of the Sakha Republic